Tazehabad-e Bozon Qaran (also Romanized as Tāzehābād-e Bozon Qarān, Tāzehābād-e Bezenqerān, and Tāzehābād-e Bozonqarān; also known as Tāzehābād) is a village in Hoseynabad-e Shomali Rural District, Saral District, Divandarreh County, Kurdistan Province, Iran. At the 2006 census, its population was 365, in 75 families. The village is populated by Kurds.

References 

Towns and villages in Divandarreh County
Kurdish settlements in Kurdistan Province